In E. coli and other bacteria, holC is a gene that encodes the chi subunit of DNA polymerase III.

References 

Bacterial proteins
DNA replication